The year 1986 in television involved some significant events. This is a list of notable events in the United States.

Events

Programs

Debuting this year

Resuming this year

Ending this year

Changing networks

Made-for-TV movies and miniseries

Television stations

Station launches

Network affiliation changes

Births

Deaths

See also
 1986 in the United States
 List of American films of 1986

References

External links 
List of 1986 American television series at IMDb

 
1980s in American television